The Church of St. John the Baptist, Stanford on Soar is a parish church in the Church of England in Stanford on Soar, Nottinghamshire.

The church is Grade I listed by the Department for Digital, Culture, Media and Sport as a building of outstanding architectural or historic interest.

History

The church was medieval but restored in 1893 and 1894 by W. S. Weatherley.

It is the most southerly church in the Diocese of Southwell and Nottingham and the Province of York.

Pipe Organ
The church has a fine two manual pipe organ by Henry Willis dating from 1895. A specification of the organ can be found on the National Pipe Organ Register

Bells
The church has eight bells.

Current parish status
It is in a group of parishes which includes:
St. Giles' Church, Costock
St. Mary's Church, East Leake
All Saints' Church, Rempstone
St. Helena's Church, West Leake
Church of St. John the Baptist, Stanford on Soar

Sources
Southwell and Nottingham Church History Project Stanford on Soar

Church of England church buildings in Nottinghamshire
Stanford on Soar